Sioux Lookout Airport  is a regional airport based in Sioux Lookout, Ontario, Canada. The airport opened in 1933. It was, at the time, the second busiest airport in North America next to Chicago Midway International Airport. Today, the airport is a "mini-hub" facilitating travel to and from many northern communities in Northwestern Ontario.

Airlines and destinations

Tenants
 Ornge Air operating Pilatus PC-12 aircraft in Medevac configuration.
 SkyCare Air Ambulance operating Medevac and charter operations.
 Wasaya Airways maintenance facility.
 Bearskin Airlines maintenance facility.
 Northern Skies Air Service operating charters with Piper Chieftains.
 Slate Falls Airways scheduled and charter services.

See also
 Sioux Lookout Water Aerodrome

References

External links
Sioux Lookout Airport

Certified airports in Kenora District
Sioux Lookout